Revolutionary Cells may mean:
Revolutionary Cells - Animal Liberation Brigade, an animal liberation activist group
Revolutionary Cells (Argentina), an anarchist urban guerilla group
Revolutionary Cells (German group), a German left-wing terrorist group
Revolutionary Nuclei, a Greek left-wing terrorist group also known as Revolutionary Cells